Dowdej (also Romanized as Dūdej; also known as Dodej, Dūdeh, Duder, and Qal‘eh Dūdij) is a village in Darian Rural District, in the Central District of Shiraz County, Fars Province, Iran. At the 2006 census, its population was 1,480, in 355 families.

According to Abdolmajid Arfaee, Dūdej is the same as the place called Dutaš mentioned in the Persepolis Administrative Archives of Darius I. It is closely associated in the Persepolis tablets with the place called Uranduš, which Arfaee suggests may have been near present-day Dariyan.

References 

Populated places in Shiraz County